The gulf chimaera (Hydrolagus alberti) is a species of cartilaginous fish in the family Chimaeridae found near Mexico, the United States, and possibly Suriname. Its natural habitat is open seas.

References 

Gulf chimaera
Fish of the Gulf of Mexico
Gulf chimaera
Taxonomy articles created by Polbot